The Advanced Transit Association (ATRA) is a non-profit organisation whose purpose is to encourage the development and deployment of Automated Transit Networks, including personal rapid transit systems. ATRA was formed in 1976 and in 1988 published a report that became an essential factor in increasing the credibility of the personal rapid transit concept.

Publications 
"Advanced Transit and Urban Revitalization, an International Dialogue" was published by the ATRA at an international conference in Indianapolis in 1978.

Industry Group Members 
Ultra Global, 2getthere, Arup, LogistikCentrum, the consulting firm of Dr. Ingmar Andreasson, PRT Consulting, Podaris, DICAM, Lea+Elliott and BergerABAM.

Academic Council Members 
University of Maryland, 
Princeton University, 
University of Bologna, 
Mineta Transportation Institute, 
Southern Illinois University

References

External links 
 Official Site

Transport industry associations
International non-profit organizations
Emerging technologies
Personal rapid transit
Non-profit organizations based in the United States